Juan García del Río (Cartagena de Indias, 1794 – Mexico City, 1856) was a Colombian diplomat, writer and politician.

He was Minister of Finance of Ecuador from 1832 to 1834. He was Minister of Finance of Peru in 1836, 1836-1837, and 1837-1838, also serving as its first ambassador to the United Kingdom in 1822.

Besides his political work he also translated a play Pizarro, written by the Irishman Richard Brinsley Sheridan which was eventually published in Valparaíso, Chile in 1844.

References

External links
 García del Río, primer Canciller del Perú
 Biografía – Banco de la República de Colombia

1794 births
1856 deaths
Ecuadorian Ministers of Finance
Peruvian Ministers of Economy and Finance
People from Cartagena, Colombia
Colombian diplomats
Colombian politicians